Ruslan Veliyev (born 30 June 1975) is a Kazakhstani wrestler. He competed in the men's freestyle 69 kg at the 2000 Summer Olympics.

References

1975 births
Living people
Kazakhstani male sport wrestlers
Olympic wrestlers of Kazakhstan
Wrestlers at the 2000 Summer Olympics
People from Aktau
Asian Games medalists in wrestling
Wrestlers at the 1998 Asian Games
Medalists at the 1998 Asian Games
Asian Games bronze medalists for Kazakhstan
21st-century Kazakhstani people
20th-century Kazakhstani people